Cauville-sur-Mer (literally Cauville on Sea) is a commune in the Seine-Maritime department in the Normandy region in northern France.

Geography
The cliffs here reach up to over 100 metres in height.

Heraldry

Population

Places of interest
 The chateau de Cauville.
 The church of St.Nicholas, dating from the eleventh century.
 The church of St.Pierre at the hamlet of Buglise, dating from the thirteenth century.

See also
Communes of the Seine-Maritime department

References

Communes of Seine-Maritime
Populated coastal places in France